This is a list of shipyards and shipbuilding companies of the Soviet Union (1922–1991).

Shipyards

Baltic Sea

Russia
 Admiralty Shipyards, Shipyard No. 194, known from 1937 to 1966 as Andre Marti Shipyard (ru), Leningrad
 Almaz Shipbuilding Company, Leningrad
 Baltic Shipyard, Shipyard No. 189 Leningrad
 Sredne-Nevskiy Shipyard, Leningrad
 Severnaya Verf, Shipyard No. 190, known between 1935- 1989 as Zhdanov Shipyard, Leningrad
 Sudomekh, Shipyard No. 196, Leningrad, merged with Admiralty yard in 1972
 Petrozavod Shipyard, Leningrad

Baltic states
 Tallinn Shipyard, Tallinn
 Klaipeda Shiprepair Yard, Klaipėda

Black Sea

Ukraine / Crimea
 Black Sea Shipyard, Nikolayev South Shipyard, Shipyard No. 444, also known as Andre Marti (South) Yard (Shipyard No. 198), Nikolayev
 Kherson Shipyard, Kherson
 Okean Shipyard, Nikolayev
 Shipyard named after 61 Communards, Nikolaev North Shipyard, Shipyard No. 200, also known as Shipyard No. 445, Nikolayev
 Zaliv Shipbuilding yard, Shipyard No. 532, Kerch
 Sevastopol Shipyard, Zavod imeni Sergo Ordzhonikidze No. 201,  Sevastopol
 More Shipyard, Feodosiya

Sea of Azov

Russia
 Azov Verf, a shipbuilding and shiprepair yard in Azov

Ukraine
 Mariupol Shipyard, Mariupol

Barents Sea 
 Russian Shipyard Number 10, Polyarny

White Sea
 Severnoye Mashinostroitelnoye Predpriyatie Sevmash, Shipyard 402, Severodvinsk
 Zvezdochka shipyard, Severodvinsk

Pacific Ocean 
 Dalzavod Yard, Shipyard No. 202, Vladivostok
 Zvezda shipyard, Bolshoy Kamen

Inland 
 Amur Shipbuilding Plant, Leninskiy Komsomol Shipyard, Shipyard No. 199, Komsomolsk-on-Amur
 Krasnoye Sormovo Factory No. 112 named after Andrei Zhdanov, Gorky
 Leninska Kuznya Shipyard, Kiev
 Ural Machine Works, Sverdlovsk
 Zelenodolsk Gorky Plant named after A. M. Gorkiy, Zelenodolsk

Design Bureaus 
 Rubin Design Bureau
 Malakhit Design Bureau
 Severnoye Design Bureau

See also 
 Shipbuilding in Russia
 List of Russian shipbuilders

References 

 
Shipyards
Shipbuilding companies of the Soviet Union
Shipbuilding companies of the Soviet Union
Shipyards